Epagoge grotiana, common name brown-barred tortrix, is a moth of the family Tortricidae, first described by Johan Christian Fabricius in 1781.

Description
Forewings have a yellowish ochreous ground colour with brown markings. Adults are on wing from June to August and are active around dusk and at dawn. The larvae mainly feed on oak, Crataegus and Rubus species. They live within a rolled leaf, where they also overwinter.

Distribution and habitat
This species can be found in most of Europe and in the Near East. It mainly occurs in deciduous woodlands and on sand-dunes.

References

External links
 Lepiforum.de
 Norfolk Moths

Archipini
Moths described in 1781
Moths of the Middle East
Tortricidae of Europe
Taxa named by Johan Christian Fabricius